The Gulf Intracoastal Waterway is the portion of the Intracoastal Waterway located along the Gulf Coast of the United States.

Although the U.S. government proposals for such a waterway were made in the early 19th century, the Gulf Intracoastal Waterway was not completed until 1949.

EHL & WHL mileages

The Hathaway Bridge in Panama City, Florida, for example, is at mile 284.6 EHL (East of Harvey Lock). The Queen Isabella Causeway Bridge at South Padre Island is at mile 665.1 WHL (West of Harvey Lock).

Connecting waterways

The Gulf Intracoastal Waterway crosses or meets, and in some cases is confluent with, numerous other navigable rivers and waterways.  They include:

Apalachicola River
Arroyo Colorado
Atchafalaya River
Bayou Lafourche
Bayou Terrebonne
Calcasieu River
Calcasieu Ship Channel
Delcambre Canal
Houston Ship Channel
Industrial Canal
Lower Mississippi River
Mississippi River-Gulf Outlet Canal
Mobile Bay (connecting to the Tenn-Tom Waterway)
Pearl River
Sabine-Neches Waterway  (Includes portions of)
Neches River
Sabine Lake
Sabine River
Santa Rosa Sound
The Rigolets
Vermilion River

Ports and harbors

Many of the busiest ports in the United States in terms of tons of cargo are located on or near the Gulf Intracoastal Waterway.  Notable ports on or near the waterway include:

Florida
Apalachicola, Florida
Carrabelle, Florida
Panama City, Florida
Pensacola, Florida

Alabama
Mobile, Alabama - Ranked 11th busiest

Mississippi
Gulfport, Mississippi
Pascagoula, Mississippi - Ranked 29th busiest

Louisiana
Baton Rouge, Louisiana - Ranked 7th busiest
Houma, Louisiana - 
Intracoastal City, Louisiana
Lake Charles, Louisiana - Ranked 14th busiest
Larose, Louisiana
Morgan City, Louisiana
New Orleans, Louisiana - Ranked 5th busiest
Port Allen, Louisiana
Port of South Louisiana - Ranked 2nd busiest
Port of Plaquemines - Ranked 12th busiest

Texas
Beaumont, Texas - Ranked 8th busiest
Brownsville, Texas 
Corpus Christi, Texas - Ranked 3rd busiest
Port Freeport, Texas - Ranked 16th busiest
Galveston, Texas - Ranked 46th busiest
Houston, Texas - Ranked as busiest port in the United States
Port Arthur, Texas - Ranked 15th busiest
Port Lavaca - Point Comfort, Texas 
Texas City, Texas - Ranked 20th busiest
Victoria, Texas

See also
IHNC Lake Borgne Surge Barrier
Gulf Intracoastal Waterway West Closure Complex

References

 Gulf
Gulf Coast of the United States
Canals in Alabama
Canals in Florida
Canals in Louisiana
Canals in Mississippi
Canals in New Orleans
Canals in Texas
Canals opened in 1949
1949 establishments in the United States